The Howard Street Apartment District is roughly bounded by Harney, South 22nd, Landon Court and  South 24th Streets in downtown Omaha, Nebraska.  The district includes rowhouses, apartments, and apartment courts, built between 1885 and 1930 in a variety of architectural styles.

References

National Register of Historic Places in Omaha, Nebraska
Historic districts in Omaha, Nebraska
Apartment buildings in Omaha, Nebraska
Shingle Style architecture in Nebraska
Residential buildings on the National Register of Historic Places in Nebraska
Historic districts on the National Register of Historic Places in Nebraska